Mark Lawson (born 17 March 1980) is a former Canadian rugby union player. He played as a hooker and represented Canada internationally from 2002 to 2006. He was included in the Canadian squad for the 2003 Rugby World Cup and played in three group stage matches.

References 

Canadian rugby union players
Canada international rugby union players
Living people
1980 births
Sportspeople from Vancouver
Rugby union hookers